The NCAA Division I Baseball Championship is held each year from May through June and features 64 college baseball teams in the United States, culminating in the eight-team Men's College World Series (MCWS) at Charles Schwab Field Omaha in Omaha, Nebraska.

The tournament is unique in that it features four tiers of competition, alternating between double-elimination brackets and best-of-three series. In fact, throughout the entire 64-team tournament, a team can lose a total of four games and still be crowned champions.

During team selection, sixteen teams are given "national seeds". The top eight of these teams automatically host a super regional if they advance past the regional round, assuming that they have the facilities to do so. Only 2 times has a national seed not hosted due to lack of proper facilities. As in other NCAA tournaments, conference champions (usually determined by a tournament) receive automatic bids, and the selection committee fills the remaining spots.

The first tier, called Regionals, consists of 16 locations that include four teams, seeded 1 through 4, competing in a double-elimination bracket. The 16 host sites are determined mostly by merit – most No. 1 seeds host – but are also contested by bids from schools guaranteeing the NCAA a certain amount of revenue from that regional. Host teams traditionally have a large advantage, although the home team for each game is determined by rule, so the host school sometimes plays as the visiting team. The winner of each regional moves on to the second tier, the Super Regionals.

Super Regionals are played at eight locations throughout the country and consist of the 16 surviving teams, matched up by predetermined regional pairings. National seeds 1–8 cannot meet each other in the super regional and are guaranteed to host. If the higher national seed in the bracket is eliminated in the regional stage, but the lower national seed advances, the super regional will be played at the national seeded team's field.  If the two seeds are not national seeds, the Super Regional will be bid upon by the two competing teams. If the national seed wins the regional but is unable to host, the Super Regional is awarded to the other regional winner in its bracket. This scenario played out in 2015 when national seed Missouri State could not host a Super Regional because the minor league Springfield Cardinals, which have scheduling priority at the stadium where both teams play, were playing a home series at that time. The Super Regional was thus awarded to Arkansas. The two teams play a best-of-three series to determine who moves on to the MCWS. Although one school hosts all three games, the teams split home-team status in the first two games, with the host school batting last in the opening game and first in game 2. If a third game is needed, a coin toss determines home-team status.

The final eight teams meet in Omaha, Nebraska, in the Men's College World Series. The MCWS mimics the earlier rounds, consisting of two double-elimination brackets of four teams each.  Thereafter, the winners of each bracket meet in a best-of-three final. The winner of this final series wins the MCWS and is crowned the national champion.

Team titles

{{Location map+ | USA | width=450 | caption=Schools that have won the NCAA Championship  12  6  5  4  3  2  1  | relief=no | places=
   
   
   
   
   
   
   
   
   
   
   
   
   
   
   
   
   
   
   
   
   
   
   
   
   
   
   
   
   
   
   
}}

Appearances
Teams with at least 35 total appearances through the 2021 tournament are listed.

Most appearances without a title
The top five teams in this category, through the 2022 tournament, are listed.

Most NCAA tournament appearances without an MCWS appearance
The top five teams in this category (including ties), through the 2022 tournament, are listed.

Appearances by team

1947–1974

From 1947 through 1974, the NCAA tournament was divided into static geographic districts. Each district would send a representative to the College World Series.
 In 1947, the eight representatives played in two sets of single elimination playoffs, with only the two winners advancing to the College World Series in Kalamazoo.
 In 1948, the eight representatives played in two sets of double elimination playoffs, with only the two winners advancing to the College World Series in Kalamazoo.
 In 1949, the eight representatives played in four sets of best-of-three series, with only the four winners advancing to the College World Series in Wichita.
 From 1950 through 1953, the eight representatives all advanced to the College World Series in Omaha, but the participants in various district playoffs and tournaments are not considered to have been part of the NCAA tournament.
 From 1954 through 1974, each district selected its representative either by committee, or after a district tournament consisting of 2 to 6 teams. Any team that participated in a district tournament is considered to have played in the NCAA tournament.

The code in each cell represents the furthest the team made it in the respective tournament:
  Team played in a District tournament, but did not win it (1954–1974).
  Team was the district representative but did not reach the College World Series (1947–1949).
  Team advanced to the College World Series, but was not one of the top two teams.
  National Runner-up
  National Champion

1975–1998

From 1975 through 1998, the NCAA tournament consisted of eight regionals, the winners of each advanced to the College World Series. However, unlike previous tournaments, there was no requirement that the regions consist of an exact set of states.

The code in each cell represents the furthest the team made it in the respective tournament:
  Team was selected for a Regional, but did not win it.
  Team advanced to the College World Series, but was not one of the top two teams.
  National Runner-up
  National Champion

Starting in 1982, the NCAA identified 5 teams as national seeds and ensured they played in different regionals. Starting in 1987, the NCAA identified the top 8 national seeds and put them in different regionals. These national seeds often hosted the Regional round, but not at the near-automatic rate of hosting in the modern NCAA Tournament.

1999–present
Starting in 1999, the NCAA expanded to a 64-team format with 16 regionals seeded 1 through 4.

The code in each cell represents the furthest the team made it in the respective tournament:
  Team was selected for a Regional, but did not win it.
  Team won their Regional and advanced to the Super Regional round, but did not win it.
  Team advanced to the Men's College World Series, but was not one of the top two teams.
  National Runner-up
  National Champion

These are usually, but not always, the 16 teams hosting in the Regional round.

The official name of the final phase has been "Men's College World Series" since no later than 2008, but the first edition in which the NCAA consistently used the word "Men's" in the event branding was the 2022 edition.

Past formats

1947
The first tournament was an 8 team single elimination tournament.  Four teams each were put into two playoff brackets, named the "Eastern playoff" and the "Western playoff."  The winner of each bracket moved on to the College World Series, which was, at that time, a 2 team best-of-three-game series.

1948
The second year of the tournament maintained the "Eastern playoff" and "Western playoff" format, however, they were now double elimination.  The winner of each bracket moved on to the College World Series to play a best-of-three-game series.

1949
The third year of the tournament consisted of four regions named Region A, Region B, Region C, and Region D.  Each region consisted of two teams playing in a best-of-three-game series.  The winner of each region moved on to the College World Series, which was now a four-team double-elimination tournament.

1950–1953
From 1950 through 1953, the preliminary rounds were not managed by the NCAA but rather by the district colleges, and thus these games are not recorded in the official history books of the NCAA.  The winner of each district managed playoff (although some districts did not have playoffs and chose to select their teams by committee) were sent to the College World Series, which was an eight-team double-elimination tournament. The 1950 event was the first in Omaha, where it has remained.

1954–1974
From 1954 through 1974 the tournament consisted of eight districts, named by number.  Each consisted of between two and five teams playing in differently formatted tournaments.  Some years included automatic College World Series qualifiers, and that team played no district games; for an example see 1959.  The winner of each district moved on to the College World series, which was double-elimination.

1975
The first year of the regional format was 1975.  Eight regionals consisted of four teams in a double-elimination tournament.  The winner of each regional moved on to the College World Series, also double-elimination.

1976–1981
The tournament essentially remained unchanged from the 1975 version, however, one regional consisted of six teams in a double-elimination tournament, with four teams in each of the other seven regionals.  The winner of each regional moved on to the College World Series, also double-elimination.

1982–1987
The tournament expanded again in 1982—to 36 teams—to include two regionals with six teams while the other six regionals only had four teams.  The Regionals remained double-elimination with the winners moving onto the College World Series, also double-elimination.

Subsequently, the tournament field expanded to 38 teams in 1985, 40 teams in 1986, and 48 teams in 1987.

1988–1998
From 1988 through 1998, the NCAA tournament featured 48 teams, which contested in eight regionals of six teams each for the right to go to the College World Series.

1999–2017

The four-team regional format and the best-of-three super regional format debuted in 1999, with the expansion of the tournament to 64 teams.

The best-of-three championship series at the College World Series debuted in 2003 after CBS ceased coverage of the "one-off" College World Series championship game. This allowed the NCAA to institute the best-of-three series for the finals, which better mimics the traditional three-game series played during the regular season and makes a pitching staff's depth a key factor. ESPN and ESPN2 now cover the entire CWS. After 61 years at Johnny Rosenblatt Stadium, the College World Series moved to the new TD Ameritrade Park in 2011.

2018
For the first time, the 2018 NCAA Division I baseball tournament will seed the top 16 teams, rather than only the top 8 teams as has been the practice since 1999.  This will ensure that the regional featuring top ranked team will be paired with the regional hosted by the sixteenth seeded team, where in the past Super Regionals were paired generally along geographical lines.
ESPN, ESPN2, ESPNU, SEC Network, & ESPN3 covered every regional. Longhorn Network also covers games that Texas hosts for people in Texas for regionals but featured on ESPN3 since Longhorn Network is an ESPN sports network only in Texas. All Super Regionals are on ESPN, ESPN2 & ESPNU. However they are mainly on ESPN2 & ESPNU. The CWS is on ESPN & ESPN2.

National seeds
Since 1999, the NCAA has awarded eight teams with a national seed. These teams automatically host a super regional if they advance past the regional round, unless their facilities are considered inadequate by the NCAA and thus do not bid to host, or their home stadium is unavailable because of scheduling conflicts; in some cases, a team may share a stadium with a minor league professional baseball team, or if their stadium does not meet NCAA requirements, host the event at the professional team's stadium. The former was the case for Cal State Fullerton in 1999, as its ballpark lacked the required seating capacity and media facilities at the time. In 2015, Missouri State was unable to host because of scheduling conflicts with the minor-league team whose off-campus ballpark it used. In 2018, the NCAA expanded the national seeds to 16 teams, guaranteeing the lower seed the super regional if the higher seed does not advance.

Gray Shade and Italics indicates team made the Men's College World Series.Bold Italics indicates team won the Men's College World Series.

{|class=wikitable
|-
!Year
!No. 1
!No. 2
!No. 3
!No. 4
!No. 5
!No. 6
!No. 7
!No. 8
!No. 9
!No. 10
!No. 11
!No. 12
!No. 13
!No. 14
!No. 15
!No. 16
|-
|-
| 2018
| style="background:#B2BEB5;"|Florida
| 
| style="background:#B2BEB5;"|Oregon State
| Ole Miss
| style="background:#B2BEB5;"|Arkansas
| style="background:#B2BEB5;"|North Carolina
| 
| 
| style="background:#B2BEB5;"|Texas Tech
| Clemson
| 
| 
| style="background:#B2BEB5;"|Texas
| 
| Coastal Carolina
| NC State
|-
| 2019
| UCLA
| style="background:#B2BEB5;"|Vanderbilt
| 
| Georgia
| style="background:#B2BEB5;"|Arkansas
| style="background:#B2BEB5;"|Mississippi State
| style="background:#B2BEB5;"|Louisville
| style="background:#B2BEB5;"|Texas Tech
| 
| 
| Stanford
| Ole Miss
| LSU
| North Carolina
| 
| Oregon State
|-
| 2020
| colspan=16 align=center|No tournament due to the COVID-19 pandemic
|-
| 2021
| Arkansas
|style="background:#B2BEB5;"|Texas
|style="background:#B2BEB5;"|Tennessee
|style="background:#B2BEB5;"|Vanderbilt
|style="background:#B2BEB5;"|Arizona
| TCU
|style="background:#B2BEB5;"|Mississippi State| Texas Tech
| style="background:#B2BEB5;"|Stanford| Notre Dame
| Old Dominion
| Ole Miss
| East Carolina
| 
| Florida
| Louisiana Tech
|-
| 2022
| Tennessee
|style="background:#B2BEB5;"|Stanford| Oregon State
| Virginia Tech
|style="background:#B2BEB5;"|Texas A&M|Miami (FL) 
|Oklahoma State
|East Carolina 
| style="background:#B2BEB5;"|Texas| North Carolina
| Southern Miss
| 
| Florida
| style="background:#B2BEB5;"|Auburn| Maryland
| Georgia Southern
|}

 Regional and Super Regional Hosts (1999-present) 
Starting in 1999, the NCAA expanded to a 64-team format with a regional and subsequent super regional round, with the winners of the super regionals advancing to the MCWS. The tournament begins with 16 double-elimination regional sites of four teams each; the NCAA seeds the teams 1–4 and announces the host school and venue, which is generally hosted by the highest seeded team in the region at their home stadium. The winners of each regional (16 teams) advance to the super regional round, divided into eight super regional locations, each with two teams facing off in a best-of-three series; once again, the NCAA announces the host site between rounds, and each super regional is generally hosted by the higher-seeded of the two teams.

Teams must submit a bid for hosting rights. At times, the host venue has been hosted at a venue of the highest seed's choosing that is not its home field, or hosted by a team that is not the highest team in the region, due to a number of factors including scheduling conflicts at the highest team's home venue, the host school's home venue being inadequate to host according to NCAA criteria, the host school not submitting a bid, and severe weather.

 Italicized'' venues indicates a host venue that is not the primary home stadium of the host team. 
 Bold''' indicates the host team won the series. 
 An asterisk (*) indicates that the host school was not the highest seeded team in that year's regional or super regional.

Notes

Attendance

The highest single-game attendance for an NCAA Super Regional was at Dudy Noble Field, Polk-Dement Stadium at Mississippi State University.  On Saturday, June 12, 2021, 14,385 watched Mississippi State beat Notre Dame 9–8 in game 1 of a best of 3. The second highest was set the day after as 13,971 fans saw Notre Dame even the series with a 9–1 victory. For the decisive Monday game, 11,784 fans saw the Bulldogs defeat the Fighting Irish 11–7 to send Mississippi State on to the College World Series. This set the overall Super Regional at 40,140, breaking the former record of 35,730 set when Arkansas hosted Missouri State in a Super Regional in 2015. The highest for an off-campus facility was set at Zephyr Field, a minor-league park in New Orleans.  In 2001, Tulane and LSU battled for 3 games in front of 34,341 fans.

The highest single-game attendance for an NCAA Regional game was also set at Mississippi State; 11,511 watched Mississippi State vs Central Michigan on June 1, 2019.   For total attendance during a Regional series, LSU holds the top 2 spots at 67,938 in 1998 and 66,561 in 1997.  Mississippi State holds the next three to round out the top 5--64,723 in 1997, 63,388 in 1989, and 62,191 in 1990.  All of those Top 5 regional attendance records were set under the old six-team Regional format.

Longest game in college baseball history

The longest college baseball game was a 2009 regional game between Boston College and host Texas on May 30 in Austin. Texas won 3–2 in 25 innings, which lasted over seven hours.

The third-longest game in tournament history occurred in a 2012 regional game between Kent State and Kentucky at U.S. Steel Yard in Gary, Indiana, where Kent State won 7–6 in 21 innings.

See also
College World Series
List of NCAA Division I baseball programs
NCAA Division I college baseball team statistics
List of college baseball awards
List of college baseball career home run leaders
World University Baseball Championship

Footnotes

External links